Dirhininae is a subfamily of chalcidid wasps in the family Chalcididae. There are four genera.

References

External links 
 
 Dirhininae in the Universal Chalcidoidea Database

Chalcidoidea
Apocrita subfamilies